The ninth series of Dancing with the Stars premiered on 24 April 2022 on Three.

Cast 
The series will be hosted by Clint Randell and Sharyn Casey. Camilla Sacre-Dallerup will return to the judging panel as head judge, while James Luck and Lance Savali will join the judging panel for their first series. Sacre-Dallerup contracted Covid-19 and was replaced in the final programme by Karen Hardy.

Couples 
The full cast was announced on 3 April. It was also announced that Eli Matthewson and Jonny Williams would make history by being the first same-sex partnership of the series.

Production 

In December 2019, it was that announced that a ninth series would air on Three in 2020. On 11 February 2020, it was announced that former contestant Laura Daniel would be replacing Rachel White on the judging panel for the ninth series. On 23 February 2020, The New Zealand Herald reported that Destiny Church Pastor and Vision NZ leader Hannah Tamaki was tipped to join the series. After major backlash online, MediaWorks confirmed that Tamaki would no longer be joining the series. In the same statement, they confirmed that the cast announcement for the ninth series was scheduled for the end of March 2020. However, due to the COVID-19 pandemic in New Zealand, the series was postponed indefinitely. In March 2022 it was confirmed that the show would return later that year.

Scorecard 

 Red numbers indicate the couples with the lowest score for each week.
 Green numbers indicate the couples with the highest score for each week.
  indicates the couples eliminated that week.
  indicates the returning couple that finished in the bottom two.
  the returning couple that was the last to be called safe.
  the couple withdrew from the competition.
  the couple were eliminated but later returned to the competition.
  indicates the winning couple.
  indicates the runner-up couple.
  indicates the couple who placed third.
  indicates the couple who placed fourth.

Average score chart 
This table only counts for dances scored on a 30-point scale.

Highest and lowest scoring performances 
The best and worst performances in each dance according to the judges' 30-point scale are as follows:

Couples' highest and lowest scoring dances 
Scores are based upon a potential 30-point maximum (team dances are excluded).

Weekly scores 
Individual judges' scores in the charts below (given in parentheses) are listed in this order from left to right: James Luck, Camilla Sacre-Dallerup, Lance Savali.

Week 1: Anzac Day 
 Running order (Night 1)

 Running order (Night 2)

Week 2: Top 40 
 Running order (Night 1)

 Running order (Night 2)

Week 3: Mother's Day 
 Running order (Night 1)

Running order (Night 2)

Judge's vote to save

 Luck: Vaz & Brittany
 Savali: Kerre & Jared
 Sacre-Dallerup: Vaz & Brittany

Week 4: Club Night & My Jam 
 Running order

Judge's vote to save

 Luck: Vaz & Brittany
 Savali: Eric & Loryn
 Sacre-Dallerup: Eric & Loryn

Week 5: Semi-Finals 
Eric & Loryn withdrew from the competition after Eric tested positive for COVID-19, Vaz & Brittany were brought back in.
Rhys & Phoebe withdrew from the competition after they both tested positive for COVID-19, Kerre & Jared were brought back in.
 Running order

Judge's vote to save

 Luck: Vaz & Brittany
 Savali: Vaz & Brittany
 Sacre-Dallerup: Did not vote, but would have voted to save Vaz & Brittany

Week 6: Final 
Individual judges' scores in the charts below (given in parentheses) are listed in this order from left to right: James Luck, Karen Hardy, Lance Savali.
Camilla Sacre-Dallerup was absent after testing positive for COVID-19, Karen Hardy replaced her on the judges table.
 Running order (Top 4)

 Running order (Top 2)

Dance chart 

  Highest scoring dance
  Lowest scoring dance

References

series 9
2022 New Zealand television seasons